The men's 110 metres hurdles event at the 1999 Pan American Games was held July 28–30.

Medalists

Results

Heats
Qualification: First 3 of each heat (Q) and the next 2 fastest (q) qualified for the final.

Wind:Heat 1: +0.8 m/s, Heat 2: +1.6 m/s

Final
Wind: +1.1 m/s

References

Athletics at the 1999 Pan American Games
1999